Merhoff is one of the forty subbarrios of Santurce, San Juan, Puerto Rico.

Demographics
In 2000, Merhoff had a population of 4,955.

In 2010, Merhoff had a population of 3,023 and a population density of 23,253.8 persons per square mile.

Location
Although Merhoff Street commences its journey south of Baldorioty Expressway on Marginal Street, only the space covered between Gilberto Monroig Street and Conde Avenue is considered the Merhoff sector.

See also
 
 List of communities in Puerto Rico

References

Santurce, San Juan, Puerto Rico
Municipality of San Juan